Ayjan (also Romanized as Ayjān, Ejān, and Eyjān; also known as Ichān and Īshān) is a village in Javersiyan Rural District, Qareh Chay District, Khondab County, Markazi Province, Iran. At the 2006 census, its population was 1,161, in 332 families.

References 

Populated places in Khondab County